The 2016 Maui Invitational Tournament was an early-season college basketball tournament that was played for the 33rd time.  The tournament began in 1984, and was part of the 2016–17 NCAA Division I men's basketball season. The Championship Round was played at the Lahaina Civic Center in Maui, Hawaii from November 21 to 23. Opening round games previously played at campus sites were discontinued.

Brackets 
* – Denotes overtime period

Opening round
The opening round was played on November 11–17 at various sites around the country.

November 11
Chattanooga 81, Tennessee 69 in Knoxville, Tennessee
Oregon 91, Army 77 in Eugene, Oregon
Wisconsin 79, Central Arkansas 47 in Madison, Wisconsin

November 13
North Carolina 97, Chattanooga 57 in Chapel Hill, North Carolina

November 14
Oklahoma State 102, Central Arkansas 90 in Stillwater, Oklahoma

November 17
Arkansas State 78, Georgetown 72 in Washington, D.C.

Regional round

*Games played at Christl Arena in West Point, New York

Championship round

References

Maui Invitational tournament
Maui Invitational
Maui Invitational